Diani Beach is a major beach on the Indian Ocean coast of Kenya (in eastern Africa).

It has been voted Africa's leading beach destination for the fifth time running since 2015.

Tourism

Diani is one of the most prominent tourism resort areas of Kenya. The indigenous people of the area are the Digo, one of the nine ethnic communities known as the Mijikenda. Today the area includes Kenyans of various ethnicities who have migrated to Diani, drawn by the tourism related economy. With a population of over 100,000 inhabitants, the Diani/Ukunda urban area is one of the largest at the Kenyan coast and forms part of the larger Mombasa metropolitan region. A small airstrip - Ukunda Airport - is located between the beach area and the Mombasa-Lunga Lunga road. The water remains shallow near shore, with some underwater sandbars near the surface which allow wading with a clear view of the sandy bottom. Inland from the beach, there is extensive vegetation (see photo at right), including numerous palm trees which cover the coastal areas, unlike the dry acacia trees of the mountainous Kenyan Highlands. The Mwachema River flows into the sea at Diani Beach.

The general area is known for its coral reefs, black-and-white colobus monkeys, and for the closely located Shimba Hills National Reserve, a wildlife reserve which looks out over the Indian Ocean. Diani Beach has restaurants, hotels, supermarkets, and several shopping centres.

Diani Beach is also a popular kitesurfing, jet skiing, and snorkelling location.

The 16th century Kongo Mosque is located at the Northern tip of Diani Beach, where the Kongo river flows into the ocean separating Diani beach from Tiwi. It is the last remaining ancient Swahili structure in Diani.

See also

Historic Swahili Settlements
Swahili architecture

References

Swahili people
Swahili city-states
Swahili culture
Populated places in Kwale County
Beaches of Kenya
Mombasa